Lieutenant Marie Charles Maurice Lecoq De Kerland was a World War I flying ace credited with seven aerial victories.

Sources of information

References

1887 births
1978 deaths
French World War I flying aces